Alexei Mikhailovich Guryshev (b. March 14, 1925 - December 16, 1983) was a Russian ice hockey center.  A four-time Soviet all-star, he was the top goal scorer in the Soviet Union five times:  1949, 1953, 1955, 1957, and 1958.  He scored a total of 379 goals in 300 league games, making him the third highest goal scorer in league history.

Guryshev played on the national team between 1954 and 1959, scoring 71 goals in 92 games.  He helped lead the Soviets to the gold medal at both the 1954 IIHF World Championships and the 1956 Winter Olympics. He was awarded the Order of the Badge of Honor (1957).

After his playing career, he became an international referee.

References

External links
Alexey Guryshev at CCCP International
Alexei Guryshev

1925 births
1983 deaths
Ice hockey players at the 1956 Winter Olympics
Ice hockey people from Moscow
Krylya Sovetov Moscow players
Medalists at the 1956 Winter Olympics
Olympic gold medalists for the Soviet Union
Olympic ice hockey players of the Soviet Union
Olympic medalists in ice hockey
Soviet bandy players
Soviet ice hockey centres